The men's hammer throw at the 1934 European Athletics Championships was held in Turin, Italy, at the  Stadio Benito Mussolini on 8 September 1934.

Medalists

Results

Final
8 September

Participation
According to an unofficial count, 11 athletes from 7 countries participated in the event.

 (2)
 (1)
 (2)
 (1)
 (2)
 (2)
 (1)

References

Hammer throw
Hammer throw at the European Athletics Championships